The South Pacific Open Championship was a golf tournament held at Tina Golf Club, Nouméa, New Caledonia from 2011 to 2016. It was a Tier 2 event on the Australasian Tour. In 2011, the first year of the event, Tier 2 events did not receive Official World Golf Ranking points. Total prize money was A$110,000 in 2011, A$120,000 in 2012, A$130,000 in 2013, A$140,000 in 2014 and 2016 and A$150,000 in 2015.

Winners

References

External links
Coverage on PGA Tour of Australasia's official site

Former PGA Tour of Australasia events
Golf tournaments in New Caledonia
Recurring sporting events established in 2011
Recurring sporting events disestablished in 2016